Indianapolis Executive Airport  is a public airport at 11329 E. State Road 32, five miles north of Zionsville, in Boone County, Indiana, United States. The airport is owned by the Hamilton County Airport Authority. In 2020, the airport was categorized as a "National" airport in the National Plan of Integrated Airport Systems. 	

Most U.S. airports use the same three-letter location identifier for the FAA and for IATA, but Indianapolis Executive Airport is TYQ to the FAA and has no IATA code. It was formerly Terry Airport .

History 
Campbell Aviation began developing Indianapolis Executive Airport (TYQ) as Terry Airport in 1957 with a  bituminous runway configured in a north–south direction and a  turf runway configured in a northeast–southwest direction. It was certified by the State of Indiana in 1958. The airport included 10 T-hangars and an administration building. A few years later, 26 more T-hangars were added.

In 1965, the Campbells sold the airport to the Van Sickles. Other improvements included installing High Intensity Runway Lights (HIRL), Visual Approach Slope Indicators (VASI-2) for both runways, and an Instrument Landing System, including a Non-Directional Beacon (NDB). Three large hangars were also added.

The airport was classified as a reliever to Indianapolis International Airport in the 1980s, which opened the door for the facility to get government funding from the FAA and the state of Indiana. In 1986, TYQ received its first federal grant for construction to install underdrains for Runway 18-36 and acquire  of land for approach protection. In 1987 and 1988, other grants were received to reconstruct, widen, and groove the primary runway, which resulted in a  DWL (dual wheel loading) strength for the runway. Under this grant,  of land were acquired, an aircraft apron was constructed, and a partial parallel taxiway was added. The airport did not receive further grants until 2001 when it mitigated wetland impacts and graded the runway safety area. In 2003, the airport was purchased by Hamilton County and the Hamilton County Airport Authority began receiving a series of grants for reimbursement for that purchase.

Facilities and aircraft 
For the 12-month period ending December 31, 2019, the airport had 41,810 aircraft operations, an average of 115 per day: 95% general aviation and 5% air taxi. In January 2022, there were 89 aircraft based at this airport: 63 single-engine, 7 multi-engine, 16 jet and 3 helicopter.

First Wing Jet Center is the airport's full service fixed-base operator. Taft Aviation manages the airport's T-hangars. The airport is also host to Beck's Hybrids corporate aviation department. The Civil Air Patrol maintains a squadron at the airport.

Eagle Composite Squadron 
Indianapolis Executive Airport also hosts a squadron for the Civil Air Patrol. Eagle Composite Squadron is a squadron who's main weekly meeting location is TYQ. Members of the squadron meet starting at 18:00 and ending at 20:30 every Tuesday. Meetings are categorized based on what Tuesday of the month it is.  Eagle has been awarded numerous wing level awards, including Squadron of Merit (SOM) for the years 2022 and 2021. Contrary to many other squadrons in the Indiana wing, Eagle is typically lead by the cadets of the squadron (aged 12 - 21) instead of the senior (adult) members. Cadets lead meetings, host weekend and volunteer events, and teach other cadets during their weekly meetings. As of March 2023, Eagle Composite Squadron has 68 members.

References

External links 

 First Wing Jet Center., the fixed-base operator (FBO)
 Aerial photo from Indiana Department of Transportation
 
 Eagle Composite Squadron

Transportation in Indianapolis
Airports in Indiana
Transportation buildings and structures in Boone County, Indiana